The battle of Volnovakha was a military engagement which lasted from 25 February 2022 until 12 March 2022, as part of the Eastern Ukraine offensive during the 2022 Russian invasion of Ukraine. Russian and DPR forces engaged Ukrainian forces at the small city of Volnovakha in Donetsk Oblast, which is located close to the Ukrainian-DPR border.

The battle was spearheaded by DPR forces and led to the widespread destruction of the town and heavy casualties on both sides.

Battle 
The first shelling of Volnovakha began on 25 February, the second day of the invasion, and hit civilian areas. Electricity also went out in Volnovakha on the second day. The Guardian wrote that Russian bombing of Volnovakha resembled tactics that Russia had previously used on civilian targets in Syria. On that same day, DPR forces captured the nearby town of Mykolaivka. 

DPR troops entered Volnovakha on the morning of February 26, sparking clashes with the Ukrainian Aidar Battalion. A tank battle ensued at the Volnovakha bus station, with a Ukrainian servicemen stating that Russian forces lost 50 men in the battle, although they overran Ukrainian positions later on. The battle and shelling on February 26 killed 20 civilians, with Ukrainian MP Dmytro Lubinets stating bodies lay uncollected in the streets.

Between February 26 and 28, Ukrainian forces had full control of Volnovakha, although Ukrainian officials stated shelling put the town on the verge of a humanitarian crisis by February 28. 90% of buildings in the town were either damaged or destroyed by March 1, with Volnovakha also being cut off from electricity. During those two days, reinforcements on both sides arrived to Volnovakha, with impromptu territorial defense forces and foreign volunteers aiding Ukraine, and Buryat regiments, more brigades, and the DPR's Vostok Battalion all preparing for a second battle. Clashes resumed on February 28.

On March 1, 346 civilians were evacuated from Volnovakha, with 400 more on March 6. Ukrainian and Russian forces agreed to the establishment of a demilitarized humanitarian corridor on March 7 through Volnovakha and the nearby city of Mariupol, which had been under siege since 24 February, in order to evacuate civilians from the two cities; however, Russian forces allegedly violated the demilitarization zone. 

Ukrainian forces shot down a Russian plane on March 3, along with the helicopter that came to aid it afterwards. On March 5, DPR colonel and commander of the Sparta Battalion Vladimir Zhoga was killed in Volnovakha, with his father Artem immediately succeeding him. Vladimir Zhoga was posthumously awarded Hero of the Donetsk People's Republic and Hero of the Russian Federation by Denis Pushilin and Vladimir Putin respectively.

By March 11, Russian forces effectively controlled Volnovakha, facing only meager Ukrainian resistance. Donetsk Oblast governor Pavlo Kyrylenko stated Volnovakha had "effectively ceased to exist", having been destroyed in the fighting. The Associated Press stated that the city had been captured on March 12. Later that day, Ukrainian officials reported that Captain , the commander of the Ukrainian 503rd Naval Infantry Battalion, had been killed in battle.

Aftermath 
On 14 March, following the battle, a Ukrainian Su-25 was shot down by Russian forces near Volnovakha. The pilot, Roman Vasyliuk, captured by Russian forces was later released on 24 April, by a Russo-Ukrainian prisoner swap. Following the Russian capture of the city, the local newspaper "Nashe slovo" ceased publication, as most of the staff has left Volnovakha. Lidia Tarash, one of the journalists at the newspaper, was forced to flee after Russian troops targeted her house.

The capture of Volnovakha cemented the closure of Ukrainian lines and the beginning of the siege of Mariupol, which lasted until May 16.

On November 1, Ukraine claimed to have destroyed a Kadyrovite base and 10 pieces of military equipment near Volnovakha.

On 22 February 2023, chief of the Main Directorate of Intelligence of the Ministry of Defense of Ukraine Kyrylo Budanov described the defeat at Volnovakha as one of the three major Ukrainian defeats during the Russo-Ukrainian War, the other two being the defeat at the battle of Sievierodonetsk and the occupation of Crimea and parts of Donetsk and Luhansk oblasts by Russia in 2014.

See also 
 Outline of the Russo-Ukrainian War

References

Volnovakha
Volvnovakha
February 2022 events in Ukraine
March 2022 events in Ukraine
Eastern Ukraine offensive
History of Donetsk Oblast
Battles involving the Donetsk People's Republic